This is a list of native Bucharesters.

A 
 Otto Ackermann (1909–1960), conductor
 Anda Adam (born 1980), singer and model
 Gheorghe Adamescu (1869–1942), literary historian and bibliographer
 Olivia Addams (born 1996), singer
 Adena, singer
 Adolf Albin (1848–1920), chess player
 Mircea Albulescu (1934–2016), actor
 Radu Aldulescu (born 1954), novelist
 Dan Andrei Aldea (1950–2020), singer
 Liana Alexandra (1947–2011), composer, pianist, and music educator
 Andrei Alexandrescu (born 1969), Romanian-American C++ and D language programmer and author
 George Alexandru (1957–2016), actor
 Nicoleta Alexandru (born 1968), singer
 Florin-Alexandru Alexe (born 1979), economist and politician
 Marius Alexe (born 1990), footballer
 Paul Alexiu (1893–1963), general
 Barbu Alinescu (1890–1952), general
 Mosko Alkalai (1931–2008), Israeli actor
 Radu Almășan (born 1980), singer
 Melek Amet (1960–2008), model
 Doru Ana (born 1954), actor
 David Andelman (born 1955), Israeli theoretical physicist 
 Aurelian Andreescu (1942—1986), singer
 Eva Andrei, American physicist
 Ion Andreescu (1850–1882), painter
 Mihail Andricu (1894–1974), singer
 Ion Valentin Anestin (1900–1963), graphic artist, engraver, painter, sculptor, journalist, and dramatist
 Luminița Anghel (born 1968), dance/pop recording artist, songwriter, and politician
 Babis Angourakis (1951–2014), Greek politician
 Edward Aninaru (born 1976), photographer
 Constantin Anton (1894–1993), general
 Kristaq Antoniu (1907–1979), singer
 Mitzura Arghezi (1924–2015), actress and politician
 Dan Apostol (1957–2013), writer 
 Carol Ardeleanu (1883–1949), writer
 Tudor Arghezi (1880–1967), writer
 Costache Aristia (1800–1880), poet, actor, and translator
 Ștefan Arteni (1947–2020), artist, painter, calligrapher, architect, philosopher, historian, essayist, and translator
 Constantin C. Arion (1855–1923), politician
 Bazil Assan (1860–1918), engineer, explorer, and economist
 Alina Astafei (born 1969), track and field athlete
 Alexandru Athanasiu (born 1955), politician and jurist
 Genica Athanasiou (1897–1966), Romanian-French actress
 Vera Atkins (1908–2000), British intelligence officer 
 Colette Avital (born 1940), Israeli diplomat and politician
 Ana-Maria Avram (born 1961), composer
 Chris Avram (1931–1989), actor

B 
 Emanoil Bacaloglu (1830–1891), mathematician, physicist, and chemist
 Constantin Banu (1873–1940), writer, journalist, and politician  
 Elisheva Barak-Ussoskin (born 1936), Israeli judge
 Eugen Barbu (1924–1993), novelist, short story writer, and journalist
 Linda Maria Baros (born 1981), poet, translator, and literary critic
 Cezar Bădiță (born 1979), swimmer
 Alexander Bălănescu (born 1954), violinist
 Nicolae Bălcescu (1819–1852), soldier, historian, and journalist
 Radu Bălescu (1932–2006), Romanian and Belgian scientist
 Irina-Camelia Begu (born 1990), tennis player
 Alexandra Bellow (born 1935), mathematician
 Joana Benedek (born 1972), Romanian-Mexican actress
 Marthe Bibesco (1886–1973), Romanian-French writer, socialite, and political hostess
 Andreea Bibiri (born 1975), actress
 Ingrid Bisu (born 1987), actress
 Claudiu Bleonț (born 1959), actor
 Lucian Boia (born 1944), historian
 Cezar Bolliac (1813–1881), archaeologist, journalist, and poet
 Dan Bordeianu (born 1975), actor
 Mircea Bornescu (born 1980), footballer
 Constantin Bosianu (1815–1882), jurist and politician
 Ana Maria Brânză (born 1984), épée fencer
 Emilian Bratu (1904–1991), chemical engineer
 Florin Bratu (born 1980), footballer
 Roxana Briban (1971–2010), operatic soprano
 Silviu Brucan (1916–2006), communist politician
 Dionis Bubani (1926–2006), Albanian writer, playwright, humorist, and translator
 Dragoș Bucur (born 1977), actor
 Gheorghe Bucur (born 1980), football player
 Doina Bumbea (1950–1997), artist and abductee in North Korea

C 

 Alexandra Cadanțu (born 1990), tennis player
 Nicolae Cajal (1919–2004), Jewish physician, academic, politician and philanthropist
 Rukmini Maria Callimachi (born 1973), Romanian-American journalist and poet
 Christian Calson (born 1975), Romanian-American independent filmmaker
 Constantin Cantacuzino (1905–1958), aviator
 Catherine Caradja (1893–1993), aristocrat and philanthropist
 Costache Caragiale (1815–1877), actor and theatre manager
 Mateiu Caragiale (1885–1936), poet and prose writer
 Toma Caragiu (1925–1977), theatre, television and film actor
 Ion Caramitru (born 1942), stage and film actor
 Nae Caranfil (born 1960), film director and screenwriter
 Barbu Catargiu (1807–1862), politician and journalist
 Paul Cazan (born 1951), football player
 Vera Călin (born 1921), Romanian-American literary critic, essayist and translator
 George Călinescu (1899–1965), literary critic, historian, novelist and journalist
 Gabriel Cânu (born 1981), footballer
 Mircea Cărtărescu (born 1956), poet, novelist and essayist
 Nicu Ceaușescu (1951–1996), the youngest child of Romanian leader Nicolae and Elena Ceaușescu
 Remus Cernea (born 1974), activist
 Hristu Chiacu (born 1986), footballer
 Maia Ciobanu (born 1952), composer and music educator
 Victor Ciocâltea (1932–1983), chess master
 Liviu Ciulei (1923–2011), theater and film director, film writer, actor, architect, educator, costume, and set designer
 Henri Coandă (1886–1972), inventor, aerodynamics pioneer, and builder of an experimental aircraft
 Alina Cojocaru (born 1981), ballet dancer
 Dragoș Coman (born 1980), swimmer
 Sergiu Comissiona (1928–2005), Romanian-Israeli-American conductor and violinist
 Grigore C. Crăiniceanu (1852–1935), military officer, War Minister, and member of the Romanian Academy
 Michael Cretu (born 1957), Romanian–German musician
 Sergiu Cunescu (1923–2005), social democratic politician

D 
 Alexandru Darie (1959–2019), theater director 
 Cella Delavrancea (1887–1991), pianist, writer, and teacher of piano 
 Henrieta Delavrancea (1897–1987), architect 
 Lucia Demetrius (1910–1992), novelist, poet, playwright, and translator
 Cristian Diaconescu (born 1959), jurist and politician
 Gheorghe Dinică (1934–2009), actor
 Neagu Djuvara (1916–2018), historian, essayist, philosopher, journalist, novelist, and diplomat
 Dora d'Istria (1828–1888), Wallachian-born Romantic writer and feminist of Albanian descent
 Ion G. Duca (1879–1933), prime minister of Romania (1933)

E 
 Mircea Eliade (1907–1986), historian of religion, fiction writer, and philosopher
 David Emmanuel (1854–1941), mathematician, member of the Romanian Academy

F 

 Nicolae Filimon (1819–1865), novelist and short-story writer
 Răzvan Fodor (born 1975), singer and actor

G 

 Grigore Gafencu (1892–1957), politician, diplomat and journalist
 Moses Gaster (1856–1939), Romanian-born Jewish-British scholar and a Hebrew linguist
 Alex Geana (born 1979), Romanian-American photographer and writer
 Mircea Geoană (born 1958), politician
  (1887–1974), sculptor
 Florin Gheorghiu (born 1944), chess player
 Ion Ghica (1816–1897), revolutionary, mathematician, diplomat and politician
 Alexandru Ghika (1902–1964), mathematician
 Alexandru G. Golescu (1819–1881), politician

H 

 Clara Haskil (1895–1960), classical pianist
 John Houseman (1902–1988), Romanian-born British-American actor and film producer

I 
 Andrew Ilie (born 1976), tennis player
 Cristina Ionda, actress
 Cassius Ionescu-Tulcea (born 1923), mathematician
 Andrei Ioniță (born 1994), cellist
 Anghel Iordănescu (born 1950), footballer and manager of the national football team
 Edward Iordănescu (born 1978), football manager and former player
 Diana Iovanovici Șoșoacă (born 1975), Romanian lawyer and politician
 Iosif Iser (1881–1958), painter and graphic artist
 Nora Iuga (born 1931), poet, writer, and translator

J 

 Marcel Janco (1895–1984), Romanian and Israeli visual artist, architect and art theorist

K 
 Marin Karmitz (born 1938), French businessman
 Sergiu Klainerman (born 1950), mathematician
 Franz Kneisel (born 1865), Romanian-American violinist
 Alex Kozinski (born 1950), judge on the United States Court of Appeals for the Ninth Circuit

L 

 Traian Lalescu (1882–1929), mathematician
 Alexandra Maria Lara (born 1978), Romanian-born German actress
 Dinu Lipatti (1917–1950), classical pianist and composer
 Monica Lovinescu (1923–2008), essayist, short story writer, literary critic, translator and journalist
 Gherasim Luca (1913–1994), Surrealist theorist and poet

M 

 Alexandru Macedonski (1854–1920), poet, novelist, dramatist and literary critic
 Aureliu Manea (1945–2014), theatre director, actor, and writer
 Roxana Maracineanu (born 1975), Romanian-born French backstroke swimmer
 Gheorghe Marinescu (1863–1938), neurologist
 Cezar Mateus (born 1961), Romanian-American luthier
 Ion Gheorghe Maurer (1902–2000), communist politician and lawyer
 Preda Mihăilescu (born 1955), mathematician
 Ion Minulescu (1881–1944), avant-garde poet, novelist, short story writer, journalist and playwright
 Jacob L. Moreno (1889–1974), Austrian-American psychiatrist and psychosociologist, thinker and educator
 Maia Morgenstern (born 1962), film and stage actress

N 

 Adrian Năstase (born 1950), politician, Prime Minister of Romania from 2000 to 2004
 Ilie Năstase (born 1946), tennis player
 Eddy Novarro (born 1925), photographer, collector and cosmopolitan

P 
 Sașa Pană (1902–1981), avant-garde poet, novelist, and short story writer
 Cristina Pasaroiu (born 1987), soprano
 Marcel Pauker (1896–1938), communist militant
 Nicolae Paulescu (1869–1931), physiologist and politician
 Camil Petrescu (1894–1957), playwright, novelist, philosopher and poet
 Dan Petrescu (1953–2021), Romanian businessman and billionaire, one of the richest persons in Romania at the time
 Andrei Pleșu (born 1948), philosopher, essayist, journalist, literary and art critic
 Valentin Poénaru (born 1932), Romanian–French mathematician
 Elvira Popescu (1894–1993), Romanian-French stage and film actress and theatre director
 Petru Popescu (born 1944), Romanian-American writer, director and movie producer
 Ion Popescu-Gopo (1923–1989), graphic artist and animator
 Cristi Puiu (born 1967), film director and screenwriter

R 

 Connect-R (born 1982), musician 
 Victor Rebengiuc (born 1933), film and stage actor
 Lia Roberts (born 1949), politician
 Edward G. Robinson (1893–1973), Romanian-American actor
 Gideon Rodan (born 1934), Romanian-American biochemist
 Alexandru Rosetti (1895–1990), linguist, editor, and memoirist
 Leon Rotman (born 1950), sprint canoer

S 

 Răzvan Sabău (born 1977), tennis player
 Nicolae Saramandu (born 1941), Romanian linguist and philologist
 Alec Secăreanu (born 1984), actor
 Serge Spitzer (born 1951), Romanian-American artist 
 Saviana Stănescu (born 1967), Romanian-American poet, playwright and journalist
 Sorin Stati (1931–2008), linguist
 Simion Stoilow (1873–1961), mathematician
 Barbu Ștefănescu Delavrancea (1858–1918), writer and poet

T 
 Maria Tănase (1913–1963), singer and actress
 Toni Tecuceanu (1972–2010), comedy actor
 Cicerone Theodorescu (1908–1974), poet
 George Topîrceanu (1886–1937), poet, short story writer and humourist
 Corneliu Vadim Tudor (1949-2015), politician, poet, writer, journalist, and a Member of the European Parliament
 Șerban Țițeica (1908–1985), quantum physicist

V 
 Elena Văcărescu (1864–1947), Romanian-French aristocrat writer
 Vazken I of Bucharest (1908–1994), Catholicos of the Armenian Apostolic Church (1953–1994)
 Ion Vianu (born 1934), writer and psychiatrist
 Ion Vîlcu (born 1966), software engineer, academic, administrator and diplomat
 Dan-Virgil Voiculescu (born 1949), mathematician
 Ion Vitner (1914–1991), literary critic and historian
 Cătălin Voicu (born 1965), politician 
 George Vraca (1896–1964), stage and film actor
 Alexandru Vulpe (1931–2016), historian and archaeologist, member of the Romanian Academy

W 
 Eugen Weber (born 1925), Romanian-born American historian
 Richard Wurmbrand (1909–2001), minister

Z  
 George Mihail Zamfirescu (1898–1939), prose writer and playwright

 
Bucharesters
Bucharest